Alias "Ali" Lembakoali (born 27 March 1971) is a retired Central Africa-Slovak football striker.

Career
In July 1997, he joined Slovak club FK Matador Púchov. In next time Ali played for the Slovak champion club Inter Bratislava and Austrian clubs SC Eisenstadt, SC-ESV Parndorf 1919, UFC Mannersdorf from lower leagues. Lembakoali became the "face" of the civic association People Against Racism (ĽPR) and the International Football Against Racism in Europe (FARE).

External links

at soccer.azplayers.com
at futbalnet.sk

References

1971 births
Living people
Central African Republic footballers
Association football forwards
Central African Republic international footballers
Central African Republic expatriate footballers
Expatriate footballers in Slovakia
Central African Republic expatriate sportspeople in Slovakia
MŠK Žilina players
AFC Nové Mesto nad Váhom players
MŠK Púchov players
FK Inter Bratislava players
Slovak Super Liga players
3. Liga (Slovakia) players
SC-ESV Parndorf 1919 players
MŠK Iskra Petržalka players
FK Slovan Most pri Bratislave players